Putilla lucida is a species of sea snail, a marine gastropod mollusc, unassigned in the superfamily Seguenzioidea.

Description
The solid, white shell is rimate. it is subpellucid, smooth, and shining, white. The four whorls are convex. The thick outer lip simple.

Distribution
This marine species occurs off Japan.

References

External links
 To World Register of Marine Species

lucida
Gastropods described in 1867